A prefix is a part of a word attached to a beginning of a word which modifies the meaning of that stem.
 Possessive prefix, a prefix used in word formation for creation of various possessive forms

Prefix may also refer to:
In computing science:
Prefix (computer science), a substring starting at the initial position of a reference string
Prefix is one of the attributes defined by the RDFa extension.
Network address prefix, the initial part of a network address, used in address delegation and routing
Binary prefix, a name or associated symbol that can precede a unit of measure in computing to indicate multiplication by a power of two
Prefix order (mathematics), a generalization of the notion of prefix of a string, and of the notion of a tree
Numerical prefix, a prefix derived from the words for numbers in various languages, most commonly Greek and Latin
SI prefix or metric prefix, a name or associated symbol that precedes a unit of measure (or its symbol) to form a decimal multiple or submultiple
Descriptor (chemistry), a prefix placed before the systematic substance name for chemical compounds
Prefix code, a type of code in coding theory
Namespace identifier of a Unique identifier
Trunk prefix, the initial number to be dialled in a domestic telephone call
Telephone prefix, the first set of digits in a telephone number not a country code or area code
ITU prefix, a call sign for radio and television stations.
Ship prefix, a combination of letters used in front of the name of a civilian or naval ship
Prefix notation or Polish notation, a method of mathematical expression
Prefix Magazine, an alternative media publication about music
Prefix (acoustics), the initial part of the sound, one of J. F. Schouten's five major acoustic parameters

See also
 Suffix (disambiguation)